The Crni Timok (Serbian Cyrillic: Црни Тимок, "Black Timok"), also known as Crna River ( / Crna reka, "Black River") or Krivovirski Timok ("Timok of Krivi Vir"), is a headwater of the Timok River.

It originates from the northern side of the Veliki Maljenik mountain, in the Kučaj area of eastern Serbia. It flows near the village of Krivi Vir and continues generally to the north-east, flowing through the Crnorečka kotlina (Црноречка котлина, "depression of Crna Reka"), populated with many smaller villages (Lukovo, Jablanica, Valakonje, Savinac, Gamzigrad, Zvezdan). At Gamzigrad there is also an important archeological site from Roman times.

After a flow of 84 km, the Crni Timok reaches Zaječar, where it joins the Beli Timok River, forming the Veliki Timok River.

Early in its course it receives from the right the Radovanska, Suva, Velika, Salešča, Šarbanovačka, Jasenova, Bajnska and Suva rivers and from the left the Velika Suvaja, Mirovska, Arnauta, Osnička. Since most of the right tributaries come from the highly polluted area of the Bor copper mining basin, they pollute the Crni Timok.

References

External links

Rivers of Serbia
Timok Valley
Zaječar District
Bor District